The Fremantle Post Office located in Market Street, Fremantle was designed by Hillson Beasley of the Public Works Department, planned in 1906 and opened in 1907. It was renovated during the Western Australian Centenary year of 1929, and again in 1987 for the America's Cup challenge. It continues to serve as a post office.

A site on the other (east) side of Market Street, and further south, was also considered in 1905 as a location for the new post office. The shops along Market Street and bordered by Cantonment Street and High Street were to be resumed, and a new building built; this never eventuated.

The building is listed on the Register of the National Estate.

References

External links

Buildings and structures in Fremantle
Market Street, Fremantle
Post office buildings in Western Australia
Western Australian places listed on the defunct Register of the National Estate
State Register of Heritage Places in the City of Fremantle